Novyye Karashidy (Yañı Qaraşiźe) is a rural locality (a village) in Cherkassky Selsoviet, Ufimsky District, Bashkortostan, Russia. The population was 97 as of 2010. There are 9 streets.

Geography 
Novyye Karashidy is located 36 km northeast of Ufa (the district's administrative centre) by road. Volkovo is the nearest rural locality.

References 

Rural localities in Ufimsky District